Azerbaijan is administratively divided into 66 districts and 11 cities that are subordinate to the Republic. Out of these, 7 districts and 1 city is located within the Nakhchivan Autonomous Republic. The districts are further divided into municipalities.

Additionally, the districts of Azerbaijan are grouped into 14 Economic Regions. On July 7, 2021, the President of Azerbaijan Ilham Aliyev signed Decree "On the new division of economic regions in the Republic of Azerbaijan".

Administrative divisions

Contiguous Azerbaijan 

The territory of former Nagorno-Karabakh Autonomous Oblast presently consists of the districts of Khojavend, Shusha, Khojaly, the eastern portion of Kalbajar and the western portion of Tartar. The Autonomous Oblast was abolished on 26 November 1991, by the Supreme Soviet of the Azerbaijan SSR. Since then, the territory of the autonomous oblast has been administratively split between the aforementioned districts.

As a result of the First Nagorno-Karabakh War, most of Nagorno-Karabakh and surrounding districts came under the occupation of ethnic Armenian forces. The self-proclaimed Republic of Artsakh also controlled a large part of southwestern Azerbaijan outside Nagorno-Karabakh. The Azerbaijani districts completely or partially controlled by Artsakh are noted in the list. Artsakh does not recognise these districts and has its own system of administrative division. Azerbaijan regained control of all of the surrounding districts and large parts of Nagorno-Karabakh following the 2020 Nagorno-Karabakh war.

The list below represents mainland Azerbaijan and excludes the districts of the Nakhchivan Autonomous Republic:

Nakhchivan Autonomous Republic 

The seven districts and one municipality of the Nakhchivan Autonomous Republic are listed below.

Economic Regions

See also 
 ISO 3166-2:AZ
 List of regions of Azerbaijan by Human Development Index

References 

 
Azerbaijan
Azerbaijan
Azerbaijan
Administrative divisions